The Rudolf Virchow Monument is an outdoor monument to Rudolf Virchow, who was a pathologist, archaeologist, politician and public-health reformer. The monument was created by Fritz Klimsch from 1906 to 1910, and is located on Karlplatz in Berlin-Mitte, Germany.

References

External links

 

1910 establishments in Germany
1910 sculptures
Mitte
Statues in Berlin
Outdoor sculptures in Berlin
Rudolf Virchow
Sculptures of men in Germany
Statues in Germany